Rathinirvedam is a 1978 Indian Malayalam-language erotic film directed by Bharathan and written by P. Padmarajan based on his own novel of the same name. The plot revolves around a teenager, Pappu (Krishnachandran), who is sexually attracted to an older woman, Rathi (Jayabharathi).

The story-line of the film miffed many for its sensitive portrayal of the lead as well as garnered appreciation for its narrative. It is said to have redefined the art of movie making in South India, and hence regarded as a landmark in Indian film history. The film was also one of the biggest box office hits in Kerala's history. It inspires similar productions all over South India, even decades after its release.

Plot

The story takes place in a small village surrounded by hills and valleys. Young Pappu, a teenager, awaiting school results to go to college, has plenty of time on hand. His trouble is adolescence, but neither his mother nor his aunt can diagnose his affliction. Everything around him excites and stimulates his sexual curiosity. Twenty plus Rathi, the girl next door, has been chechi (elder sister) to him since he was a child. Unaware of the stirrings of his desire, she dismisses his first overtures to her as boyish pranks. But soon her feelings change.

She is sympathetic to the boy's confusion and goes to the sarppakkavu (cobra-shrine) to keep a midnight date with Pappu. It storms and thunders while Pappu makes love to Rathi. Only then do the storms—the one tormenting him inside his mind and the other raging thunderously on the outside, subside. Aghast at what has happened, Rathi stumbles to her feet but is bitten by a cobra but she goes back to her house and suffers in silence in order to prevent any scandal and the delay costs her life. Next morning Pappu leaves home for college and his new life.

Cast
Jayabharathi as Rathi
Krishnachandran as Pappu  
Kaviyoor Ponnamma as Saraswathi  
K.P.A.C. Lalitha as Bharathi 
Meena as Narayaniyamma 
Soman as Krishnan Nair 
Adoor Bhasi  
Master Manohar
Baby Sumathi as Shanthi 
Bahadoor as Kochammani
T. R. Omana

Production
The film was produced by Hari Pothan under the banner of Supriya Films. It was mostly shot in Nelliampathi, Palakkad, Kerala. Director Bharathan had proposed to actress K.P.A.C. Lalitha after the shooting of this film. They remained together till the death of the former.

Soundtrack 
The music was composed by G. Devarajan and the lyrics were written by Kavalam Narayana Panicker.

Analysis
Rathinirvedam is an incisive portrayal of a teenager's coming to terms with his budding libido that eventually drives him into a tabooed bond with an affable spinster in the neighbourhood. A teenage mind caught in the flux of sexual adolescence is captured beautifully through the lens by the director Bharathan. Steamy scenes restrict the movie to mature audiences. In typical Bharathan style, an unexpected climax leaves the audience in tears.  Jayabharathi gives a commendable performance as the titular character in this movie.

Legacy and criticism
Rathinirvedam is regarded as a landmark in Indian film history. It is one of the most sensuous movies of all time, and is said to have redefined the art of movie making in South India. The extremely erotic scenes performed by Jayabharathi sent heat waves across Kerala. Even when some of the intelligentsia predicted the beginning of a new era of parallel cinema, a major section of Malayalis were on the warpath saying that mainstream Malayalam cinema had degenerated to porn. But in spite of the criticism, Rathinirvedam became one of the biggest box office hits in Kerala's history. It inspires similar productions all over South India, even decades after its release. It is notorious causing the influx of soft porn Malayalam films during the next two decades.

Remake

A remake of the film was made in 2011. It was directed by T. K. Rajeev Kumar. Shwetha Menon played the female lead, and Sreejith played the young male lead. Padmarajan himself was credited as the writer.

Awards
Filmfare Award for Best Film - Malayalam won by Hari Pothan (1978)

References

External links
 

1970s Malayalam-language films
1970s coming-of-age drama films
1970s erotic drama films
Films based on Indian novels
Films directed by Bharathan
Indian coming-of-age drama films
Indian erotic drama films
Films with screenplays by Padmarajan
1978 drama films
1978 films